The following is a list of the 6 schools who field men's ice hockey teams in NCAA Division II competition.

History
Second-tier ice hockey has twice collapsed since 1980. Its current iteration is solely a result of the NCAA policy barring Division II schools from participating in Division III tournament which would have prevented those conferences from receiving an automatic bid into the National Tournament. Because only six schools play at the D-II level, no NCAA Tournament is currently being held (as of 2023). A seventh school, Stonehill, left the D-II ranks in July 2022 when it moved its athletic program to the Division I Northeast Conference.

The teams comprising the Division II level played in Division III conferences until 2009 but have been playing their conference tournaments since 2000.

Men

Notes
 Teams previously played at the Division II level until 1984.
 Saint Anselm and Saint Michael's were jointly members of Division II and III conferences from 2009 to 2017.

 As of 2021–22, no women's ice hockey programs operate at the Division II level. Four of the six D-II men's ice hockey schools (Franklin Pierce, Post, Saint Anselm, Saint Michael's) field women's varsity teams; all compete in the New England Women's Hockey Alliance, a fully recognized league at the National Collegiate level (the de facto equivalent of Division I). Assumption will start a women's hockey program in 2023, this team will also compete in the NEWHA.

See also
List of NCAA Division I ice hockey programs
List of NCAA Division III ice hockey programs
List of NCAA Division II institutions

References

External links
USCHO men's team list
USCHO women's team list

Division II
Division II Programs
NCAA Division II ice hockey